Pseudonortonia is a fairly large genus of potter wasps with a rich Afrotropical fauna, as well as with several species which occur throughout the Palearctic and Indomalayan regions.

Species
The following species are included in Pseudonortonia:

Pseudonortonia aberratica (Morice, 1903)
Pseudonortonia abbreviaticornis Giordani Soika, 1941
Pseudonortonia aegyptiaca (Saussure, 1863)
Pseudonortonia arida Giordani Soika, 1987
Pseudonortonia arnoldiv Giordani Soika, 1936
Pseudonortonia aterrimav Giordani Soika, 1989
Pseudonortonia aurantiaca Giordani Soika, 1936
Pseudonortonia barbara Giordani Soika, 1992
Pseudonortonia bhamensis Giordani Soika, 1941
Pseudonortonia bicarinata Guichard, 1986
Pseudonortonia bisuturalis (Saussure, 1852)
Pseudonortonia boranensis Giordani Soika, 1939
Pseudonortonia braunsii (Kohl, 1906)
Pseudonortonia bushirensis Giordani Soika, 1943
Pseudonortonia caffra (Meade-Waldo, 1911)
Pseudonortonia coniux Giordani Soika, 1983
Pseudonortonia convexiuscula Giordani Soika, 1939
Pseudonortonia depressa Giordani Soika, 1983
Pseudonortonia difformis (Saussure, 1852)
Pseudonortonia elongata Giordani Soika, 1941
Pseudonortonia fischeri Giordani Soika, 1987
Pseudonortonia flavolineata Giordani Soika, 1983
Pseudonortonia fragosa (Kohl, 1906)
Pseudonortonia gambiensis(Meade-Waldo, 1911)
Pseudonortonia gujaratica (Nurse, 1902)
Pseudonortonia henrica (Cameron, 1908)
Pseudonortonia interiacens Giordani Soika, 1987
Pseudonortonia jucunda Gusenleitner, 2008
Pseudonortonia kibonotensis (Cameron, 1910)
Pseudonortonia kisangani (Bequaert, 1918)
Pseudonortonia leclercqi Giordani Soika, 1989
Pseudonortonia lomholdti Giordani Soika, 1983
Pseudonortonia maculinoda (Cameron, 1910)
Pseudonortonia malelensis (Bequaert, 1918)
Pseudonortonia morula (Kohl, 1906)
Pseudonortonia omanensis Giordani Soika, 1979
Pseudonortonia parvula (Saussure, 1852)
Pseudonortonia pharao (Saussure, 1863)
Pseudonortonia paulyi Giordani Soika, 1989
Pseudonortonia pretiosissima (Giordani Soika, 1943)
Pseudonortonia rubrosignata Gusenleitner, 1992
Pseudonortonia rufolineata (Cameron, 1905)
Pseudonortonia rufoquadripustulata (Cameron, 1910)
Pseudonortonia scotti Giordani Soika, 1957
Pseudonortonia somala Giordani Soika, 1989
Pseudonortonia soror (Kohl, 1906)
Pseudonortonia sudanensis (Schulthess, 1920)
Pseudonortonia tegulata Giordani Soika, 1989
Pseudonortonia tenuis Gusenleitner, 2002
Pseudonortonia tilkiani Guichard, 1986
Pseudonortonia tricarinulata (Bequaert, 1918)
Pseudonortonia uncinata Giordani Soika, 1989
Pseudonortonia unicata (Giordani Soika, 1990)
Pseudonortonia zairensis (Bequaert, 1918)

References

Biological pest control wasps
Potter wasps